The women's keirin competition at the 2020 UEC European Track Championships was held on 14 November 2020.

Results

First round
The first three riders in each heat qualified to final 1–6, all other riders advanced to final 7–12.

Heat 1

Heat 2

Finals

Small final

Final

References

Women's keirin
European Track Championships – Women's keirin